Hanerik (Han'airike, Khaneriq; , formerly  / , formerly ) is a town in Hotan County, Hotan Prefecture, Xinjiang, China.


History

In 1984, Hanerik Township was established.

In 2012, Hanerik was changed from a township into a town.

On June 28, 2013, an incident involving Muslim protesters and local police in Hanerik occurred. Chinese state media said no one died during the confrontation. There were reports of protester deaths, as many as over 100.

Administrative divisions
Hanerik includes one residential community and forty-one villages:

Residential community (Mandarin Chinese Hanyu Pinyin-derived names except where Uyghur is provided):
Baihe

Villages:
Jigedai'airike (Jigedai Airikecun), Kaleta, Youhao, Köl'ëriq (Kule'airike;  / ), Tasimiqi, Wuqikunmaidan, Bagewan, Balamasi, Youkurihan'airike, Qiang'ayimake, Tuowanhan'airike, Han'airike, Pa'erqi, Youkakun, Arong, Bashituonu, Tuogayi, Qiaxianbaibazha, Minhe, Xiamailai, Tuonu, Hongxing, Layika, Duxianbaibazha, Tiemu'erqi, Tayitake, Yurushikai, Kezile'airike, Kegezi'airike, Seriwei, Qiaka'er, Bayimailai, Kuma, Bakale, Yingmailai, Guzaile, Kuoke, Wusitangboyi, Kuokeqi, Agemake, Ayagedun

References

Populated places in Xinjiang
Township-level divisions of Xinjiang